John Dalton (c. 1610 – 30 August 1679) was an English politician who sat in the House of Commons  between 1659 and 1679.

Dalton was the son of John Dalton, a vintner of Nottingham, and his wife Isabel. He settled at Derby where he became a draper. In 1645, he became an alderman of Derby and was mayor in 1646. He was mayor again in 1652. In 1657 he was commissioner for assessment for Derbyshire.

In 1659, Dalton was elected Member of Parliament for Derby in the Third Protectorate Parliament.  In 1660, he was re-elected MP for Derby in the Convention Parliament. He was re-elected in 1661 as MP for Derby in the Cavalier Parliament and sat until 1679. 
 
Dalton was the senior alderman of Derby when he died on a visit to Nottingham. He was buried in St Werburgh's chancel in Derby.

Dalton married Anne Pyott, daughter of Richard Pyott of Streetly, Staffordshire and had two sons.

References

1610 births
1679 deaths
English MPs 1659
English MPs 1660
English MPs 1661–1679
Mayors of Derby